The San Antonio mayoral election of 2009 was held on May 9, 2009. The incumbent mayor Phil Hardberger was term-limited after serving two terms. The election was won by Julian Castro, who took office on June 1, 2009.

Announced Candidates

 Former City Councilman and 2005 Mayoral Candidate Julian Castro
 City Councilwoman (District 8) Diane Cibrian
 City Councilwoman (District 2) Sheila D. McNeil
 PR Consultant and small business owner Trish DeBerry-Mejia
 Perennial Candidate Julie Iris Oldham
 Perennial Candidate Rhett R. Smith
 Perennial Candidate Michael "Commander" Idrogo
 Napoleon Madrid
 Lauro Bustamante

Frontrunner Status

After the deadline to file passed, four candidates (Castro, Cibrian, McNeil and DeBerry-Mejia) were considered the frontrunners in the race. Polls showed Castro ahead by big margins, and some polls showed Castro winning outright without need for a runoff election. Second place was highly contentious, with Cibrian and DeBerry-Mejia trading off for second place.

Election Day

On May 9, 2009, the election for Mayor was held. Turnout was slightly higher in the May 2009 election than the May 2007 elections, with 11.61% of registered voters casting a ballot in the 2009 election (as opposed to 10.16% in 2007). Also, more votes were cast during Early Voting than on election day (55,780 votes cast during Early Voting to 34,055 on Election Day.)

A majority of votes is required to win the office of Mayor of San Antonio. If no person earns a majority, the two top vote earners shall advance to a runoff election to decide. Mayoral elections are non-partisan.

 
 
 
 
 
 
 
 
 
 
 
* Vote percentage only include votes for San Antonio Mayor. The remaining 1.78 percent in the election voted for different constituencies, or did not cast a vote for Mayor of San Antonio

See also

2009 Texas elections
2009 United States mayoral elections
Julian Castro
2009
Non-partisan elections